Jarqavieh may refer to:
 Jarqavieh Olya (disambiguation)
 Jarqavieh Sofla (disambiguation)
 Jarqavieh Vosta